Buddy Faro is an American crime drama television series created by Mark Frost, starring Dennis Farina that aired on CBS from September 25 to December 4, 1998. The series was cancelled after eight episodes due to low ratings.

Premise
A legendary private investigator disappeared in 1978 when he was trying to solve the murder of the woman he fell in love with. Twenty years later he is tracked down by PI Bob Jones and together they reopen Buddy's agency, with help from actress Julie Barber and Buddy's old partner El Jefe.

Cast
Dennis Farina as Buddy Faro
Frank Whaley as Bob Jones
Allison Smith as Julie Barber
Charlie Robinson as El Jefe

Episodes

External links

1998 American television series debuts
1998 American television series endings
1990s American crime drama television series
CBS original programming
English-language television shows
Television shows set in the Las Vegas Valley
Television series by Spelling Television
Television series created by Mark Frost